Faith Christian School is a private Christian school for students in grades K-12. It is located in Yuba City, California.

Notes and references

Christian schools in California
Schools in Sutter County, California
Educational institutions established in 1975
Yuba City, California